Hibbertia leucocrossa is a species of flowering plant in the family Dilleniaceae and is endemic to the south-west of Western Australia. It is a spreading to more or less erect shrub with narrow egg-shaped leaves and yellow flowers, with 15 to 21 stamens arranged in bundles around the three carpels.

Description
The flowers are arranged singly on the ends of branchlets and short side shoots and are more or less sessile. There are 15 to 21 stamens arranged in five bundles around the three glabrous carpels that each contain a single ovule.

Taxonomy
Hibbertia leucocrossa was first formally described in 2009 Kevin Thiele in the journal Nuytsia from specimens he collected at Warradarge in 2008. The specific epithet (leucocrossa) means "white fringed".

Distribution and habitat
This hibbertia grows in low woodland and heath near Warradarge, on the Gairdner Range and near Green Head in the Geraldton Sandplains biogeographic region of south-western Western Australia.

Conservation status
Hibbertia leptopus is classified as "not threatened" by the Western Australian Government Department of Parks and Wildlife.

See also
List of Hibbertia species

References

leucocrossa
Flora of Western Australia
Plants described in 2009
Taxa named by Kevin Thiele